= Surasak Koomgun =

Thai footballer (born 1989)

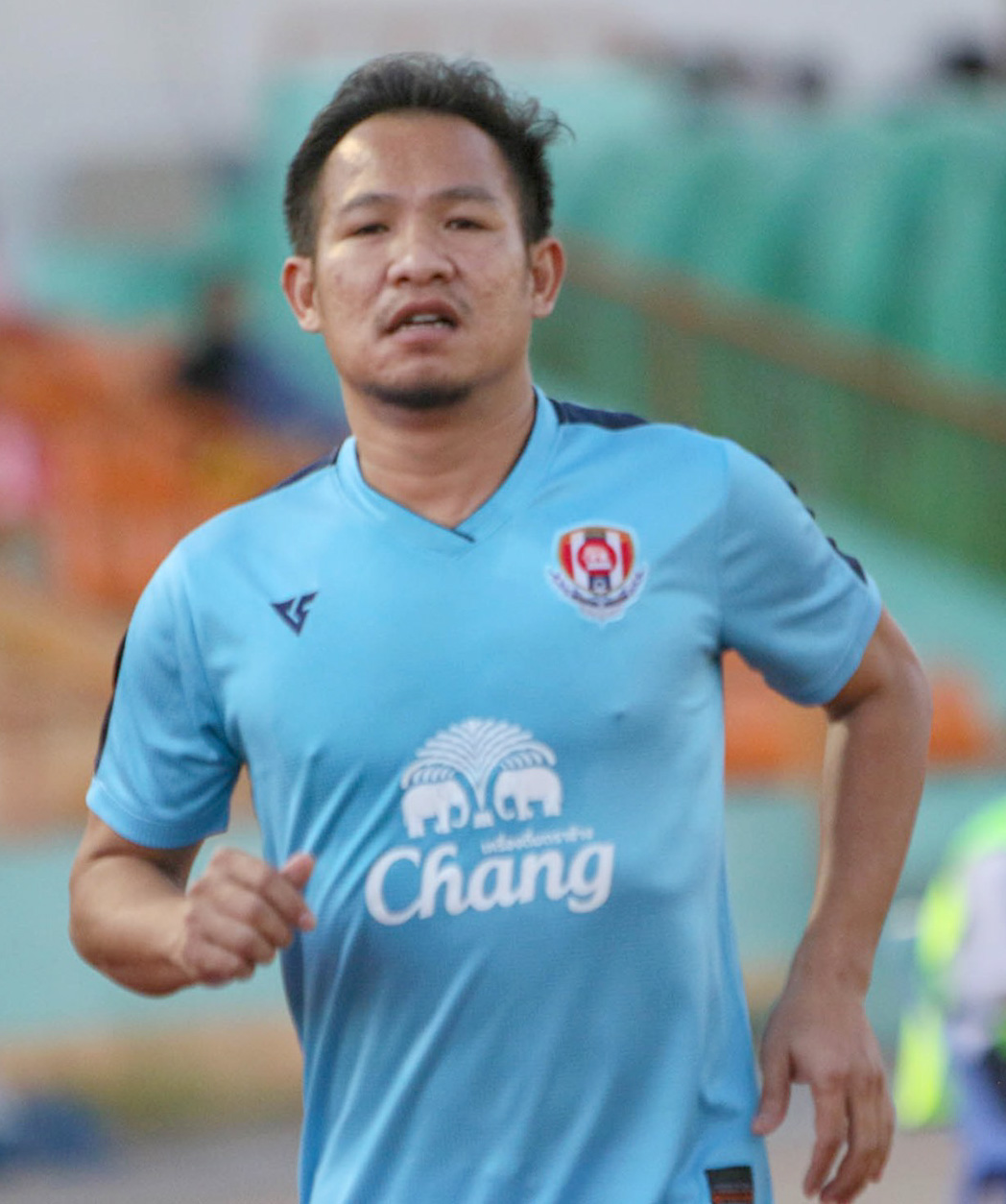

Personal information
- Full name: Surasak Koomgun
- Date of birth: 31 May 1989 (age 37)
- Place of birth: Thailand
- Height: 1.72 m (5 ft 8 in)
- Position: Attacking midfielder

Senior career*
Years	Team	Apps	(Gls)
2015–2021	Navy	17	(1)
- * Club domestic league appearances and goals

Surasak Koomgun (Thai: สุรศักดิ์ คุ้มกัน) is a Thai professional footballer who plays as an attacking midfielder.
